A total solar eclipse occurred on September 12, 1950. A solar eclipse occurs when the Moon passes between Earth and the Sun, thereby totally or partly obscuring the image of the Sun for a viewer on Earth. A total solar eclipse occurs when the Moon's apparent diameter is larger than the Sun's, blocking all direct sunlight, turning day into darkness. Totality occurs in a narrow path across Earth's surface, with the partial solar eclipse visible over a surrounding region thousands of kilometres wide. Totality was visible from eastern Soviet Union (today's Russia) and the whole Semichi Islands in Alaska.

Related eclipses

Solar eclipses of 1950–1953

Saros 124

Metonic series

Notes

References

1950 09 12
1950 in science
1950 09 12
September 1950 events